Charleston is the largest city in the U.S. state of South Carolina, the county seat of Charleston County, and the principal city in the Charleston–North Charleston metropolitan area. The city lies just south of the geographical midpoint of South Carolina's coastline on Charleston Harbor, an inlet of the Atlantic Ocean formed by the confluence of the Ashley, Cooper, and Wando rivers. Charleston had a population of 150,277 at the 2020 census. The 2020 population of the Charleston metropolitan area, comprising Berkeley, Charleston, and Dorchester counties, was 799,636 residents, the third-largest in the state, 8th-largest in the Deep South and the 74th-largest metropolitan statistical area in the United States.

Charleston was founded in 1670 as Charles Town, honoring King CharlesII, at Albemarle Point on the west bank of the Ashley River (now Charles Towne Landing) but relocated in 1680 to its present site, which became the fifth-largest city in North America within ten years. It remained unincorporated throughout the colonial period; its government was handled directly by a colonial legislature and a governor sent by Parliament. Election districts were organized according to Anglican parishes, and some social services were managed by Anglican wardens and vestries. Charleston adopted its present spelling with its incorporation as a city in 1783. Population growth in the interior of South Carolina influenced the removal of the state government to Columbia in 1788, but Charleston remained among the ten largest cities in the United States through the 1840 census.

Charleston's significance in American history is tied to its role as a major slave trading port. Charleston slave traders like Joseph Wragg were the first to break through the monopoly of the Royal African Company and pioneered the large-scale slave trade of the 18th century; almost one-half of slaves imported to the United States arrived in Charleston. In 2018, the city formally apologized for its role in the American slave trade.

History

Colonial era (1670–1786)

King Charles II granted the chartered Province of Carolina to eight of his loyal friends, known as the Lords Proprietors, on March 24, 1663. In 1670, Governor William Sayle arranged for several shiploads of settlers from Bermuda and Barbados. These settlers established what was then called Charles Town at Albemarle Point, on the west bank of the Ashley River, a few miles northwest of the present-day city center. Charles Town became the first comprehensively planned town in the Thirteen Colonies. Its governance, settlement, and development was to follow a visionary plan known as the Grand Model prepared for the Lords Proprietors by John Locke. Because the Carolina's Fundamental Constitutions was never ratified, however, Charles Town was never incorporated during the colonial period. Instead, local ordinances were passed by the provincial government, with day-to-day administration handled by the wardens and vestries of StPhilip's and StMichael's Anglican parishes.

At the time of European colonization, the area was inhabited by the indigenous Cusabo, whom the settlers declared war on in October 1671. The settlers initially allied with the Westo, a northern indigenous tribe that traded in enslaved Indians. The settlers abandoned their alliance with the Westo in 1679 and allied with the Cusabo instead.

The initial settlement quickly dwindled away and disappeared while another village—established by the settlers on Oyster Point at the confluence of the Ashley and Cooper rivers around 1672—thrived. This second settlement formally replaced the original Charles Town in 1680. (The original site is now commemorated as Charles Towne Landing.) The second location was more defensible and had access to a fine natural harbor. The new town had become the fifth largest in North America by 1690.

A smallpox outbreak erupted in 1698, followed by an earthquake in February 1699. The latter caused a fire that destroyed about a third of the town. During rebuilding, a yellow fever outbreak killed about 15% of the remaining inhabitants. Charles Town suffered between five and eight major yellow fever outbreaks over the first half of the 18th century.

It developed a reputation as one of the least healthy locations in the Thirteen Colonies for ethnic Europeans. Malaria was endemic. Although malaria did not have such high mortality as yellow fever, it caused much illness. It was a major health problem through most of the city's history before dying out in the 1950s after use of pesticides cut down on the mosquitoes that transmitted it.

Charles Town was fortified according to a plan developed in 1704 under Governor Nathaniel Johnson. Both Spain and France contested Britain's claims to the region. Various bands of Native Americans and independent pirates also raided it.

On September 5–6, 1713 (O.S.) a violent hurricane passed over Charles Town. The Circular Congregational Church manse was damaged during the storm, in which church records were lost. Much of Charles Town was flooded as "the Ashley and Cooper rivers became one." At least seventy people died in the disaster.

From the 1670s Charleston attracted pirates. The combination of a weak government and corruption made the city popular with pirates, who frequently visited and raided the city. Charles Town was besieged by the pirate Blackbeard for several days in May 1718. Blackbeard released his hostages and left in exchange for a chest of medicine from Governor Robert Johnson.

Around 1719, the town's name began to be generally written as Charlestown and, excepting those fronting the Cooper River, the old walls were largely removed over the next decade. Charlestown was a center for the inland colonization of South Carolina. It remained the southernmost point of the Southern Colonies until the Province of Georgia was established in 1732. As noted, the first settlers primarily came from Europe, Barbados and Bermuda. The Barbadian and Bermudan immigrants were planters who brought enslaved Africans with them, having purchased them in the West Indies.

Early immigrant groups to the city included the Huguenots, Scottish, Irish, and Germans, as well as hundreds of Jews, predominately Sephardi from London and major cities of the Dutch Republic, where they had been given refuge. As late as 1830, Charleston's Jewish community was the largest and wealthiest in North America.

By 1708, the majority of the colony's population were Black Africans. They had been brought to Charlestown via the Atlantic slave trade, first as indentured servants and then as slaves. In the early 1700s, Charleston's largest slave trader, Joseph Wragg, pioneered the settlement's involvement in the slave trade. Of the estimated 400,000 captive Africans transported to North America to be sold into slavery, 40% are thought to have landed at Sullivan's Island off Charlestown. Free people of color also migrated from the West Indies, being descendants of white planters and their Black consorts, and unions among the working classes.

In 1767 Gadsden's Wharf was constructed at the city port on the Cooper River; it ultimately extended 840 feet and was able to accommodate six ships at a time. Many slaves were sold from here. Devoted to plantation agriculture that depended on enslaved labor, South Carolina became a slave society: it had a majority-Black population from the colonial period until after the Great Migration of the early 20th century, when many rural Blacks moved to northern and midwestern industrial cities to escape Jim Crow laws.

At the foundation of the town, the principal items of commerce were pine timber and pitch for ships and tobacco. The early economy developed around the deerskin trade, in which colonists used alliances with the Cherokee and Creek peoples to secure the raw material.

At the same time, Indians took each other as captives and slaves in warfare. From 1680 to 1720, approximately 40,000 native men, women, and children were sold through the port, principally to the West Indies such as (Bermuda and the Bahamas), but also to other Southern colonies. The Lowcountry planters did not keep Indian slaves, considering them too prone to escape or revolt. They used the proceeds of their sale to purchase enslaved Black Africans for their own plantations. The slave raiding—and the European firearms it introduced—helped destabilize Spanish Florida and French Louisiana in the 1700s during the War of the Spanish Succession. But it also provoked the Yamasee War of the 1710s that nearly destroyed the colony. After that, South Carolina largely abandoned the Indian slave trade.

The area's unsuitability for growing tobacco prompted the Lowcountry planters to experiment with other cash crops. The profitability of growing rice led the planters to pay premiums for slaves from the "Rice Coast" who knew its cultivation; their descendants make up the ethnic Gullah who created their own culture and language in this area. Slaves imported from the Caribbean showed the planter George Lucas's daughter Eliza how to raise and use indigo for dyeing in 1747.

Throughout this period, the slaves were sold aboard the arriving ships or at ad hoc gatherings in town's taverns. Runaways and minor slave rebellions prompted the 1739 Security Act, which required all white men to carry weapons at all times (even to church on Sundays). Before it had fully taken effect, the Cato or Stono Rebellion broke out. The white community had recently been decimated by a malaria outbreak, and the rebels killed about 25 white people before being stopped by the colonial militia. As a result of their fears of rebellion, whites killed a total of 35 to 50 Black people.

The planters attributed the violence to recently imported Africans and agreed to a 10-year moratorium on slave importation through Charlestown. They relied for labor upon the slave communities they already held. The 1740 Negro Act also tightened controls, requiring a ratio of one white for every ten Blacks on any plantation (which was often not achieved), and banning slaves from assembling together, growing their own food, earning money, or learning to read. Drums were banned because Africans used them for signaling; slaves were allowed to use string and other instruments. When the moratorium expired and Charlestown reopened to the slave trade in 1750, the memory of the Stono Rebellion resulted in traders avoiding buying slaves from the Congo and Angola, whose populations had a reputation for independence.

By the mid-18th century, Charlestown was the hub of the Atlantic slave trade in the Southern Colonies. Even with the decade-long moratorium, its customs processed around 40% of the enslaved Africans brought to North America between 1700 and 1775, and about half up until the end of the African trade.

The plantations and the economy based on them made this the wealthiest city in the Thirteen Colonies and the largest in population south of Philadelphia. In 1770, the city had 11,000 inhabitants—half slaves—and was the 4th-largest port in the colonies, after Boston, New York, and Philadelphia.

The elite began to use their wealth to encourage cultural and social development. America's first theater building was constructed here in 1736; it was later replaced by today's Dock Street Theater. StMichael's was erected in 1753. Benevolent societies were formed by the Huguenots, free people of color, Germans, and Jews. The Library Society was established in 1748 by well-born young men who wanted to share the financial cost to keep up with the scientific and philosophical issues of the day.

American Revolution (1776–1783)

Delegates for the Continental Congress were elected in 1774, and South Carolina declared its independence from Britain on the steps of the Exchange. Slavery was again an important factor in the city's role during the Revolutionary War. The British attacked the settlement three times, assuming that the settlement had a large base of Loyalists who would rally to their cause once given some military support. The loyalty of white Southerners towards the Crown had largely been forfeited, however, by British legal cases (such as the 1772 Somersett case which marked the prohibition of slavery in England and Wales; a significant milestone in the abolitionist struggle) and military tactics (such as Dunmore's Proclamation in 1775) that promised the emancipation of slaves owned by Patriot planters; these efforts did, however, unsurprisingly win the allegiance of thousands of Black Loyalists.

The Battle of Sullivan's Island saw the British fail to capture a partially constructed palmetto palisade from Col. Moultrie's militia regiment on June 28, 1776. The Liberty Flag used by Moultrie's men formed the basis of the later South Carolina flag, and the victory's anniversary continues to be commemorated as Carolina Day.

Making the capture of Charlestown their chief priority, the British sent Sir Henry Clinton, who laid siege to Charleston on April 1, 1780, with about 14,000 troops and 90 ships. Bombardment began on March 11, 1780. The Patriots, led by Benjamin Lincoln, had about 5,500 men and inadequate fortifications to repel the forces against them. After the British cut his supply lines and lines of retreat at the battles of Monck's Corner and Lenud's Ferry, Lincoln's surrender on May 12, 1780 became the greatest American defeat of the war.

The British continued to hold Charlestown for over a year following their defeat at Yorktown in 1781, although they alienated local planters by refusing to restore full civil government. Nathanael Greene had entered the state after Cornwallis's pyrrhic victory at Guilford Courthouse and kept the area under a kind of siege. British Army officer Alexander Leslie, commanding Charlestown, requested a truce in March 1782 to purchase food for his garrison and the town's inhabitants. Greene refused and formed a brigade under Mordecai Gist to counter British forays. Charlestown was finally evacuated by the British in December 1782. Greene presented the British leaders of the town with the Moultrie Flag.

Antebellum era (1783–1861)

Between the Revolutionary War and the Civil War, Charleston experienced an economic boom, at least for the top strata of society. The expansion of cotton as a cash crop in the South both led to huge wealth for a small segment of society and funded impressive architecture and culture but also escalated the importance of slaves and led to greater and greater restrictions on Black Charlestonians.

By 1783, the growth of the city had reached a point where a municipal government became desirable; therefore on August 13, 1783, an act of incorporation for the city of Charleston was ratified. The act originally specified the city's name as "Charles Ton," as opposed to the previous Charlestown, but the spelling "Charleston" quickly came to dominate.

Although Columbia had replaced it as the state capital in 1788, Charleston became even more prosperous as Eli Whitney's 1793 invention of the cotton gin sped the processing of the crop over 50 times. Britain's Industrial Revolution—initially built upon its textile industry—took up the extra production ravenously and cotton became Charleston's major export commodity in the 19th century. 

The Bank of South Carolina, the second-oldest building in the nation to be constructed as a bank, was established in 1798; branches of the First and Second Bank of the United States were also located in Charleston in 1800 and 1817.

Throughout the Antebellum Period, Charleston continued to be the only major American city with a majority-slave population. The city's widespread use of slaves as workers was a frequent subject of writers and visitors: a merchant from Liverpool noted in 1834 that "almost all the working population are Negroes, all the servants, the carmen & porters, all the people who see at the stalls in Market, and most of the Journeymen in trades". American traders had been prohibited from equipping the Atlantic slave trade in 1794 and all importation of slaves was banned in 1808, but American merchantmen frequently refused to permit British inspection for enslaved cargo, and smuggling remained common. Much more important was the domestic slave trade, which boomed as the Deep South was developed in new cotton plantations. As a result of the trade, there was a forced migration of more than one million slaves from the Upper South to the Lower South in the antebellum years. During the early 19th century, the first dedicated slave markets were founded in Charleston, mostly near Chalmers and State streets. Many domestic slavers used Charleston as a port in what was called the coastwise trade, traveling to such ports as Mobile and New Orleans.

Slave ownership was the primary marker of class and even the town's freedmen and free people of color typically kept slaves if they had the wealth to do so. Visitors commonly remarked on the sheer number of Blacks in Charleston and their seeming freedom of movement, though in fact—mindful of the Stono Rebellion and the slave revolution that established Haiti—the whites closely regulated the behavior of both slaves and free people of color. Wages and hiring practices were fixed, identifying badges were sometimes required, and even work songs were sometimes censored. Punishment was handled out of sight by the city's workhouse, whose fees provided the municipal government with thousands a year. In 1820, a state law mandated that each act of manumission (freeing a slave) required legislative approval, effectively halting the practice.

The effects of slavery were pronounced on white society as well. The high cost of 19th-century slaves and their high rate of return combined to institute an oligarchic society controlled by about ninety interrelated families, where 4% of the free population controlled half of the wealth, and the lower half of the free population—unable to compete with owned or rented slaves—held no wealth at all. The white middle class was minimal: Charlestonians generally disparaged hard work as the lot of slaves. All the slaveholders taken together held 82% of the city's wealth and almost all non-slaveholders were poor. Olmsted considered their civic elections "entirely contests of money and personal influence" and the oligarchs dominated civic planning: the lack of public parks and amenities was noted, as was the abundance of private gardens in the wealthy's walled estates.

In the 1810s, the town's churches intensified their discrimination against their Black parishioners, culminating in Bethel Methodist's 1817 construction of a hearse house over its Black burial ground. 4,376 Black Methodists joined Morris Brown in establishing Hampstead Church, the African Methodist Episcopal church now known as Mother Emanuel. State and city laws prohibited Black literacy, limited Black worship to daylight hours, and required a majority of any church's parishioners be white. In June 1818, 140 Black church members at Hampstead Church were arrested and eight of its leaders given fines and ten lashes; police raided the church again in 1820 and pressured it in 1821.

In 1822, members of the church, led by Denmark Vesey, a lay preacher and carpenter who had bought his freedom after winning a lottery, planned an uprising and escape to Haiti—initially for Bastille Day—that failed when one slave revealed the plot to his master. Over the next month, the city's intendant (mayor) James Hamilton Jr. organized a militia for regular patrols, initiated a secret and extrajudicial tribunal to investigate, and hanged 35 and exiled 35 or 37 slaves to Spanish Cuba for their involvement. Hamilton imposed more restrictions on both free and enslaved Blacks: South Carolina required free Black sailors to be imprisoned while their ships were in Charleston Harbor though international treaties eventually required the United States to quash the practice; free Blacks were banned from returning to the state if they left for any reason; slaves were given a 9:15 pm curfew; the city razed Hampstead Church to the ground and erected a new arsenal. This structure later was the basis of the Citadel's first campus. The AME congregation built a new church but in 1834 the city banned it and all Black worship services, following Nat Turner's 1831 rebellion in Virginia. The estimated 10% of slaves who came to America as Muslims never had a separate mosque. Slaveholders sometimes provided them with beef rations in place of pork in recognition of religious traditions.

The registered tonnage of Charleston shipping in 1829 was 12,410. In 1832, South Carolina passed an ordinance of nullification, a procedure by which a state could, in effect, repeal a federal law; it was directed against the most recent tariff acts. Soon, federal soldiers were dispensed to Charleston's forts, and five United States Coast Guard cutters were detached to Charleston Harbor "to take possession of any vessel arriving from a foreign port, and defend her against any attempt to dispossess the Customs Officers of her custody until all the requirements of law have been complied with." This federal action became known as the Charleston incident. The state's politicians worked on a compromise law in Washington to gradually reduce the tariffs.

Charleston's embrace of classical architecture began after a devastating fire leveled much of the city. On April 27, 1838, Charleston suffered a catastrophic fire that burned more than 1000 buildings and caused about $3 million in damage at the time. The damaged buildings amounted to about one-fourth of all the businesses in the main part of the city. When the many homes and business were rebuilt or repaired, a great cultural awakening occurred. Previous to the fire, only a few homes were styled as Greek Revival; many residents decided to construct new buildings in that style after the conflagration. This tradition continued and made Charleston one of the foremost places to view Greek Revival architecture. The Gothic Revival also made a significant appearance in the construction of many churches after the fire that exhibited picturesque forms and reminders of devout European religion.

By 1840, the Market Hall and Sheds, where fresh meat and produce were brought daily, became a hub of commercial activity. The slave trade also depended on the port of Charleston, where ships could be unloaded and the slaves bought and sold. The legal importation of African slaves had ended in 1808, although smuggling was significant. However, the domestic trade was booming. More than one million slaves were transported from the Upper South to the Deep South in the antebellum years, as cotton plantations were widely developed through what became known as the Black Belt. Many slaves were transported in the coastwise slave trade, with slave ships stopping at ports such as Charleston.

Civil War (1861–1865)

Charleston played a major part in the Civil War. As a pivotal city, both the Union and Confederate Armies vied for control of it. The Civil War began in Charleston Harbor in 1861, and ended mere months after the Union forces took control of Charleston in 1865.

Following the election of Abraham Lincoln, the South Carolina General Assembly voted on December 20, 1860, to secede from the Union. South Carolina was the first state to secede. On December 27, Castle Pinckney was surrendered by its garrison to the state militia and, on January 9, 1861, Citadel cadets opened fire on the USSStar of the West as it entered Charleston Harbor.

The first full battle of the American Civil War occurred on April 12, 1861, when shore batteries under the command of General Beauregard opened fire on the held Fort Sumter in Charleston Harbor. After a 34-hour bombardment, Major Robert Anderson surrendered the fort.

Union control of the sea permitted the repeated bombardment of the city, causing vast damage. Although Admiral Du Pont's naval assault on the town's forts in April 1863 failed, the Union navy's blockade shut down most commercial traffic. Over the course of the war, some blockade runners got through but not a single one made it into or out of the Charleston Harbor between August 1863 and March 1864.

General Gillmore's land assault in July 1864 was unsuccessful but the fall of Columbia and advance of General William T. Sherman's army through the state prompted the Confederates to evacuate the town on February 17, 1865, burning the public buildings, cotton warehouses, and other sources of supply before their departure. Union troops moved into the city within the month. The War Department recovered what federal property remained and also confiscated the campus of the Citadel Military Academy and used it as a federal garrison for the next 17 years. The facilities were finally returned to the state and reopened as a military college in 1882 under the direction of Lawrence E. Marichak.

Postbellum (1865–1945)

Reconstruction
After the defeat of the Confederacy, federal forces remained in Charleston during Reconstruction. The war had shattered the city's prosperity, but the African-American population surged (from 17,000 in 1860 to over 27,000 in 1880) as freedmen moved from the countryside to the major city. Blacks quickly left the Southern Baptist Church and resumed open meetings of the African Methodist Episcopal and AME Zion churches. They purchased dogs, guns, liquor, and better clothes—all previously banned—and ceased yielding the sidewalks to whites. Despite the efforts of the state legislature to halt manumissions, Charleston had already had a large class of free people of color as well. At the onset of the war, the city had 3,785 free people of color, many of mixed race, making up about 18% of the city's black population and 8% of its total population. Many were educated and practiced skilled crafts; they quickly became leaders of South Carolina's Republican Party and its legislators. Men who had been free people of color before the war comprised 26% of those elected to state and federal office in South Carolina from 1868 to 1876.

By the late 1870s, industry was bringing the city and its inhabitants back to a renewed vitality; new jobs attracted new residents. As the city's commerce improved, residents worked to restore or create community institutions. In 1865, the Avery Normal Institute was established by the American Missionary Association as the first free secondary school for Charleston's African American population. Gen. Sherman lent his support to the conversion of the United States Arsenal into the Porter Military Academy, an educational facility for former soldiers and boys left orphaned or destitute by the war. Porter Military Academy later joined with Gaud School and is now a university-preparatory school, Porter-Gaud School.

In 1875, blacks made up 57% of the city's and 73% of the county's population. With leadership by members of the antebellum free black community, historian Melinda Meeks Hennessy described the community as "unique" in being able to defend themselves without provoking "massive white retaliation", as occurred in numerous other areas during Reconstruction. In the 1876 election cycle, two major riots between black Republicans and white Democrats occurred in the city, in September and the day after the election in November, as well as a violent incident in Cainhoy at an October joint discussion meeting.

Violent incidents occurred throughout the Piedmont of the state as white insurgents struggled to maintain white supremacy in the face of social changes after the war and granting of citizenship to freedmen by federal constitutional amendments. After former Confederates were allowed to vote again, election campaigns from 1872 on were marked by violent intimidation of blacks and Republicans by conservative Democratic paramilitary groups, known as the Red Shirts. Violent incidents took place in Charleston on King Street on September 6 and in nearby Cainhoy on October 15, both in association with political meetings before the 1876 election. The Cainhoy incident was the only one statewide in which more whites were killed than blacks. The Red Shirts were instrumental in suppressing the black Republican vote in some areas in 1876 and narrowly electing Wade Hampton as governor, and taking back control of the state legislature. Another riot occurred in Charleston the day after the election, when a prominent Republican leader was mistakenly reported killed.

Politics
In the early 20th century strong political machines emerged in the city reflecting economic, class, racial, and ethnic tensions. The factions nearly all opposed U.S. Senator Ben Tillman who repeatedly attacked and ridiculed the city in the name of upstate poor farmers. Well organized factions within the Democratic Party in Charleston gave the voters clear choices and played a large role in state politics.

1886 earthquake

On August 31, 1886, Charleston experienced a strong earthquake. The shock was estimated to have a moment magnitude of 7.0 and a maximum Mercalli intensity of X (Extreme). It was felt as far away as Boston to the north, Chicago and Milwaukee to the northwest, as far west as New Orleans, as far south as Cuba, and as far east as Bermuda. It damaged 2,000 buildings in Charleston and caused $6 million worth of damage ($ million in  dollars), at a time when all the city's buildings were valued around $24 million ($ million in  dollars).

Charleston race riots

The Charleston race riot of 1919 took place on the night of Saturday, May 10, between members of the US Navy and the local black population. They attacked black individuals, businesses, and homes killing six and injuring dozens.

Contemporary era (1945–present)

Charleston languished economically for several decades in the 20th century, though the large federal military presence in the region helped to shore up the city's economy. Charleston's tourism boom began in earnest following the publication of Albert Simons and Samuel Lapham's Architecture of Charleston in the 1920s.

The Charleston Hospital Strike of 1969, in which mostly black workers protested discrimination and low wages, was one of the last major events of the civil rights movement. It attracted Ralph Abernathy, Coretta Scott King, Andrew Young, and other prominent figures to march with the local leader, Mary Moultrie.

Joseph P. Riley Jr. was elected mayor in the 1970s, and helped advance several cultural aspects of the city.

Between 1989 and 1996, Charleston saw two significant economic hits. First, the eye of Hurricane Hugo came ashore at Charleston Harbor in 1989, and though the worst damage was in nearby McClellanville, three-quarters of the homes in Charleston's historic district sustained damage of varying degrees. The hurricane caused over $2.8 billion in damage. The city was able to rebound fairly quickly after the hurricane and has grown in population, reaching an estimated 124,593 residents in 2009. Second, in 1993, the Base Realignment and Closure Commission (BRAC) directed that Naval Base Charleston be closed. Pursuant to BRAC action, Naval Base Charleston was closed on April 1, 1996, although some activities remain under the cognizance of Naval Support Activity Charleston, now part of Joint Base Charleston.

After having been a majority-minority city for most of its history, in the late 20th century many whites began returning to the urban core of Charleston and the area gentrified with rising prices and rents. From 1980 to 2010, the peninsula's population shifted from two-thirds black to two-thirds white; in 2010 residents numbered 20,668 whites to 10,455 blacks. Many African Americans moved to the less-expensive suburbs in these decades.

On June 17, 2015, 21-year-old white supremacist Dylann Roof entered the historic Emanuel African Methodist Episcopal Church and sat in on part of a Bible study before shooting and killing nine people, all African Americans. Senior pastor Clementa Pinckney, who also served as a state senator, was among those killed during the attack. The deceased also included congregation members Susie Jackson, 87; Rev. Daniel Simmons Sr., 74; Ethel Lance, 70; Myra Thompson, 59; Cynthia Hurd, 54; Rev. Depayne Middleton-Doctor, 49; Rev. Sharonda Coleman-Singleton, 45; and Tywanza Sanders, 26. The attack garnered national attention, and sparked a debate on historical racism, Confederate symbolism in Southern states, and gun violence, in part based on Roof's online postings. A memorial service on the campus of the College of Charleston was attended by President Barack Obama, Michelle Obama, Vice President Joe Biden, Jill Biden, and Speaker of the House John Boehner.

Condemnation of role in the slave trade
On June 17, 2018, the Charleston City Council apologized for its role in the slave trade and condemned its "inhumane" history. It also acknowledged wrongs committed against African Americans by slavery and Jim Crow laws.

Geography

The city proper consists of six distinct districts.
Downtown, or sometimes referred to as "The Peninsula", is Charleston's center city separated by the Ashley River to the west and the Cooper River to the east.
West Ashley, residential area to the west of Downtown bordered by the Ashley River to the east and the Stono River to the west
Johns Island, far western limits of Charleston, bordered by the Stono River to the east, Kiawah River to the south and Wadmalaw Island to the west
James Island, popular residential area between Downtown and the town of Folly Beach with portions of the independent town of James Island intermixed
Cainhoy Peninsula, far eastern limits of Charleston bordered by the Wando River to the west and Nowell Creek to the east
Daniel Island, residential area to the north of downtown, east of the Cooper River and west of the Wando River

Topography

The incorporated city fitted into  as late as the First World War, but has since greatly expanded, crossing the Ashley River and encompassing James Island and some of Johns Island. The city limits also have expanded across the Cooper River, encompassing Daniel Island and the Cainhoy area. North Charleston blocks any expansion up the peninsula, and Mount Pleasant occupies the land directly east of the Cooper River.

Sullivan's Island lies to the north of the entrance and Morris Island to the south. The tidal rivers (Wando, Cooper, Stono, and Ashley) are evidence of a submergent or drowned coastline. There is a submerged river delta off the mouth of the harbor, and the Cooper River is deep.

Climate

Charleston has a humid subtropical climate (Köppen climate classification Cfa), with mild winters, hot humid summers, and significant rainfall all year long. Summer is the wettest season; almost half of the annual rainfall occurs from June to September in the form of thundershowers. Fall remains relatively warm through the middle of November. Winter is short and mild, and is characterized by occasional rain. Measurable snow (≥) has a median occurrence of only once per decade at the airport, but freezing rain is more common; a snowfall/freezing rain event on January 3, 2018, was the first such event in Charleston since December 26, 2010. However,  fell at the airport on December 23, 1989, during the December 1989 United States cold wave, the largest single-day fall on record, contributing to a single-storm and seasonal record of  snowfall.

Downtown Charleston's climate is considerably milder than the airport's due to stronger maritime influence. This is especially true in the winter, with the average January low in downtown being  to the airport's  for example.

Hurricanes are a major threat to the area during the summer and early fall, with several severe hurricanes hitting the area—most notably Hurricane Hugo on September 21, 1989 (a category 4 storm).

Metropolitan Statistical Area
As defined by the U.S. Office of Management and Budget, for use by the U.S. Census Bureau and other U.S. Government agencies for statistical purposes only, Charleston is included within the Charleston–North Charleston, SC Metropolitan Statistical Area and the smaller Charleston-North Charleston urban area. The Charleston–North Charleston metropolitan area consists of three counties: Charleston, Berkeley, and Dorchester. As of the 2020 U.S. Census, the metropolitan statistical area had a total population of 799,636 people. North Charleston is the second-largest city in the metro area and ranks as the third-largest city in the state; Mount Pleasant and Summerville are the next-largest cities. These cities combined with other incorporated and unincorporated areas along with the city of Charleston form the Charleston-North Charleston urban area with a population of 548,404 . The metropolitan statistical area also includes a separate and much smaller urban area within Berkeley County, Moncks Corner (with a 2000 population of 9,123).

The traditional parish system persisted until the Reconstruction Era, when counties were imposed. Nevertheless, traditional parishes still exist in various capacities, mainly as public service districts. When the city of Charleston was formed, it was defined by the limits of the Parish of St. Philip and St. Michael, now also includes parts of St. James' Parish, St. George's Parish, St. Andrew's Parish, and St. John's Parish, although the last two are mostly still incorporated rural parishes.

Demographics

2020 census

As of the 2020 United States census, there were 150,227 people, 58,902 households, and 31,780 families residing in the city.

Language
Given Charleston's high concentration of African Americans who spoke the Gullah language, a creole language that developed on the Sea Islands and in the Low Country, the local speech patterns were also influenced by this community. Today, Gullah is still spoken by many African American residents. However, rapid development since 1980, especially on the surrounding Sea Islands, has attracted residents from outside the area and led to a decline in Gullah's prominence.

The traditional educated Charleston accent has long been noted in the state and throughout the South. It is typically heard in wealthy European American older people who trace their families back generations in the city. It has ingliding or monophthongal long mid-vowels, raises ay and aw in certain environments, and is nonrhotic. Sylvester Primer of the College of Charleston wrote about aspects of the local dialect in his late 19th-century works: "Charleston Provincialisms" (1887) and "The Huguenot Element in Charleston's Provincialisms", published in a German journal. He believed the accent was based on the English as it was spoken by the earliest settlers, therefore derived from Elizabethan England and preserved with modifications by Charleston speakers. The disappearing "Charleston accent" spoken mainly by older natives is still noted in the local pronunciation of the city's name. Many Charleston natives ignore the 'r' and elongate the first vowel, pronouncing the name as "Chalston".

Religion
Charleston is known as "The Holy City". Despite beliefs that the term dates to the city's earliest days and refers to its religiously tolerant culture, the term was coined in the 20th century, likely as a mockery of Charlestonians' self-satisfied attitude about their city. Regardless of the nickname's origination, residents have embraced the term and explained it in more flattering terms.

The Anglican church was dominant in the colonial era, and the Cathedral of St. Luke and St. Paul is today the seat of the Anglican Diocese of South Carolina. Many French Huguenot refugees settled in Charleston in the early 18th century. The Emanuel African Methodist Episcopal Church is the oldest African Methodist Episcopal church in the Southern United States and houses the oldest black congregation south of Baltimore, Maryland.

South Carolina has long allowed Jews to practice their faith without restriction. Kahal Kadosh Beth Elohim, founded in 1749 by Sephardic Jews from London, is the fourth-oldest Jewish congregation in the continental United States and was an important site for the development of Reform Judaism. Brith Sholom Beth Israel is the oldest Orthodox synagogue in the South, founded by Sam Berlin and other Ashkenazi German and Central European Jews in the mid-19th century.

The city's oldest Catholic parish, St Mary of the Annunciation Catholic Church, is the mother church of Catholicism in South Carolina, North Carolina, and Georgia. In 1820, Charleston was established as the see city of the Diocese of Charleston, which at the time comprised the Carolinas and Georgia, and presently encompasses the state of South Carolina.

The Supreme Council of the Scottish Rite, established in Charleston in 1801, is considered the mother council of the world by Scottish Rite Freemasons.

Culture

Charleston's culture blends traditional Southern U.S., English, French, and West African elements. The downtown peninsula has a number of art, music, local cuisine, and fashion venues. Spoleto Festival USA, held annually in late spring, was founded in 1977 by Pulitzer Prize-winning composer Gian Carlo Menotti, who sought to establish a counterpart to the Festival dei Due Mondi (the Festival of Two Worlds) in Spoleto, Italy.

Charleston's oldest community theater group, the Footlight Players, has provided theatrical productions since 1931. A variety of performing arts venues includes the historic Dock Street Theatre. The annual Charleston Fashion Week held each spring in Marion Square brings in designers, journalists, and clients from across the nation. Charleston is known for its local seafood, which plays a key role in the city's renowned cuisine, comprising staple dishes such as gumbo, she-crab soup, fried oysters, Lowcountry boil, deviled crab cakes, red rice, and shrimp and grits. Rice is the staple in many dishes, reflecting the rice culture of the Low Country. The cuisine in Charleston is also strongly influenced by British and French elements.

Annual cultural events and fairs
Charleston annually hosts Spoleto Festival USA founded by Gian Carlo Menotti, a 17-day art festival featuring over 100 performances by individual artists in a variety of disciplines. The annual Piccolo Spoleto festival takes place at the same time and features local performers and artists, with hundreds of performances throughout the city. Other festivals and events include Historic Charleston Foundation's Festival of Houses and Gardens and Charleston Antiques Show, the Taste of Charleston, The Lowcountry Oyster Festival, the Cooper River Bridge Run, The Charleston Marathon, Southeastern Wildlife Exposition (SEWE), Charleston Food and Wine Festival, Charleston Fashion Week, the MOJA Arts Festival, and the Holiday Festival of Lights (at James Island County Park), and the Charleston International Film Festival. The Charleston Conference is a major library industry event, held in the city center since 1980.

Music

The Gullah community has had a tremendous influence on music in Charleston, especially when it comes to the early development of jazz music. In turn, the music of Charleston has had an influence on that of the rest of the country. The geechee dances that accompanied the music of the dock workers in Charleston followed a rhythm that inspired Eubie Blake's "Charleston Rag" and later James P. Johnson's "Charleston", as well as the dance craze that defined a nation in the 1920s. "Ballin' the Jack", which was a popular dance in the years before "Charleston", was written by native Charlestonian Chris Smith.

The Jenkins Orphanage was established in 1891 by the Rev. Daniel J. Jenkins in Charleston. The orphanage accepted donations of musical instruments and Rev. Jenkins hired local Charleston musicians and Avery Institute Graduates to tutor the boys in music. As a result, Charleston musicians became proficient on a variety of instruments and were able to read music expertly. These traits set Jenkins musicians apart and helped land some of them positions in big bands with Duke Ellington and Count Basie. William "Cat" Anderson, Jabbo Smith, and Freddie Green are but a few of the alumni who became professional musicians. Orphanages around the country began to develop brass bands in the wake of the Jenkins Orphanage Band's success.

As many as five bands were on tour during the 1920s. The Jenkins Orphanage Band played in the inaugural parades of Presidents Theodore Roosevelt and William Taft and toured the US and Europe. The band also played on Broadway for the play "Porgy" by DuBose and Dorothy Heyward, a stage version of their novel of the same title. The story was based in Charleston and featured the Gullah community. The Heywards insisted on hiring the real Jenkins Orphanage Band to portray themselves on stage. Only a few years later, DuBose Heyward collaborated with George and Ira Gershwin to turn his novel into the now famous opera, Porgy and Bess (so named so as to distinguish it from the play). George Gershwin and Heyward spent the summer of 1934 at Folly Beach outside of Charleston writing this "folk opera", as Gershwin called it. Porgy and Bess is considered one of the first Great American Operas and is widely performed.

To this day, Charleston is home to many musicians in all genres.

Live theater
Charleston has a vibrant theater scene and is home to America's first theater. Most of the theaters are part of the League of Charleston Theatres, better known as Theatre Charleston. Some of the city's theaters include:
The Dock Street Theatre, opened in the 1930s on the site of America's first purpose-built theater building, is home of the Charleston Stage Company, South Carolina's largest professional theater company.
Sottile Theater is on the campus of The College of Charleston.
The Queen Street Playhouse is a former cotton warehouse that was fully converted to a theater in 1986. It is the home of the Footlight Players, a Charleston theater troupe first organized in 1932.

Museums, historical sites, and other attractions

Charleston has many historic buildings, art and historical museums, public parks, and other attractions, including:
Halsey Institute of Contemporary Art at the College of Charleston is free a non-collecting contemporary arts organization.
The Calhoun Mansion, a 24,000-square-foot, 1876 Victorian home at 16 Meeting Street, is named for a grandson of John C. Calhoun who lived there with his wife, the builder's daughter. The private house is periodically open for tours.
The Charleston Museum, America's first museum, was founded in 1773.
The Exchange and Provost was built in 1767. It is operated as a museum by the Daughters of the American Revolution.
The Powder Magazine is a 1713 gunpowder magazine and museum. It is the oldest surviving public building in South Carolina.
The Gibbes Museum of Art, opened in 1905, houses principally American works with a Charleston or Southern connection.
The Fireproof Building houses the South Carolina Historical Society which has a rotating series of historical displays.
The Nathaniel Russell House is an important federal-style house open to the public as a house museum.
The Gov. William Aiken House, also known as the Aiken-Rhett House, is a house museum built in 1820.
The Heyward-Washington House is a historic house museum owned and operated by the Charleston Museum. Furnished for the late 18th century, the house includes a collection of Charleston-made furniture.
The Joseph Manigault House is a historic house museum owned and operated by the Charleston Museum. The house was designed by Gabriel Manigault and is significant for its Adam style architecture.
The Market Hall and Sheds, also known as the City Market or simply the Market, stretch several blocks behind 188 Meeting Street. Market Hall was built in the 1841 and houses the Daughters of the Confederacy Museum. The sheds house some permanent stores, but are mainly occupied by open-air vendors.
The Avery Research Center for African American History and Culture was established to collect, preserve, and make public the unique historical and cultural heritage of African Americans in Charleston and the South Carolina Low Country. Avery's archival collections, museum exhibitions, and public programming reflect these diverse populations, as well as the wider African Diaspora.
Fort Sumter, site of the first shots fired in the Civil War, is located in Charleston Harbor. The National Park Service maintains a visitor center for Fort Sumter at Liberty Square (near the South Carolina Aquarium), and boat tours including the fort depart nearby.
The Battery is an historic defensive seawall and promenade located at the tip of the peninsula along with White Point Garden, a park featuring several memorials and Civil War-era artillery pieces.
Rainbow Row is an iconic strip of homes along the harbor that date back to the mid-18th century. Though the homes are not open to the public, they are one of the most photographed attractions in the city and are featured heavily in local art.
The South Carolina Aquarium includes revolving exhibits while its permanent focus is on the aquatic life of South Carolina. 
Waterfront Park located on the Cooper River.
Old Slave Mart museum – Located at 6 Chalmers St in the historic district is the first African American Museum. It has operated since 1938.

Sports

Charleston is home to a number of professional, minor league, and amateur sports teams:
The Charleston Battery, a professional soccer team, play in the USL Championship. The Battery play at Patriots Point Soccer Complex.
The South Carolina Stingrays, a professional hockey team, plays in the ECHL. The Stingrays play in North Charleston at the North Charleston Coliseum. The Stingrays are an affiliate of the Washington Capitals and Hershey Bears. 
The Charleston RiverDogs, a Minor League Baseball team, plays in the Low-A East and are an affiliate of the Tampa Bay Rays. The RiverDogs play at Joseph P. Riley Jr. Park.
The Charleston Outlaws RFC is a rugby union club in the Palmetto Rugby Union, USA Rugby South, and USA Rugby. It competes in Men's Division II against the Cape Fear, Columbia, Greenville, and Charlotte "B" clubs. The club also hosts a rugby sevens tournament during Memorial Day weekend.
The Charleston Gaelic Athletic Association is a Gaelic athletic club focusing on the sports of hurling and Gaelic football. The club competes in the Southeastern Division of the North American County Board of the GAA. The club hosts other division clubs in the Holy City Cup each spring.
The Lowcountry Highrollers is a women's flat-track roller derby league in the Charleston area. The league is a local member of the Women's Flat Track Derby Association.
The Family Circle Tennis Center hosts the Volvo Car Open, a major Women's Tennis Association Event. The facility is located on Daniel Island.

Other notable sports venues in Charleston include Johnson Hagood Stadium (home of The Citadel Bulldogs football team), McAlister Field House (home of The Citadel Bulldogs basketball team), and Toronto Dominion Bank Arena at the College of Charleston, which seats 5,100 people who view the school's basketball and volleyball teams.

Books and films

Various books and films have been set in Charleston; some of the best known works are listed below. In addition, Charleston is a popular filming location for movies and television, both in its own right and as a stand-in for Southern and/or historic settings.

Porgy (1925), by DuBose Heyward, adapted into the play in 1927. George Gershwin's folk opera Porgy and Bess (1935), based on the novel Porgy, is set in Charleston and was partially written at Folly Beach, near Charleston. A film version was released in 1959.
North and South series of books by John Jakes, was partially set in Charleston. The North and South miniseries was partially set and filmed in Charleston.
Part of the 1989 film Glory, starring Matthew Broderick, Denzel Washington, and Morgan Freeman, features the 1863 Second Battle of Fort Wagner on Morris Island.
The movies Swamp Thing (1982) and The Lords of Discipline (1983) (based on the novel by Pat Conroy) were partly filmed in Charleston.

Economy

Commercial shipping is important to the economy. The city has two shipping terminals, of a total of five terminals owned and operated by the South Carolina Ports Authority in the Charleston metropolitan area, which are part of the fourth-largest container seaport on the East Coast and the seventh-largest container seaport in the United States. The port is also used to transfer cars and car parts for Charleston's auto manufacturing business, such as Mercedes and Volvo.

Sometimes known as Silicon Harbor, the city is becoming a popular location for high tech and innovation, and this sector has had the highest rate of growth between 2011 and 2012, due in large part to the Charleston Digital Corridor. In 2013, the Milken Institute ranked the Charleston region as the ninth-best performing economy in the US because of its growing IT sector. Notable companies include Blackbaud, Greystar Real Estate Partners, Evening Post Industries, Le Creuset, SPARC a Booz Allen Hamilton subsidiary, BoomTown, CSS, and Benefitfocus.

In June 2017, the mean sales price for a home in Charleston was $351,186 and the median price was $260,000.

Government

Charleston has a strong mayor-council government, with the mayor acting as the chief administrator and the executive officer of the municipality. The mayor also presides over city council meetings and has a vote, the same as other council members. The current mayor, since 2016, is John Tecklenburg. The council has 12 members who are each elected from single-member districts.

Fire department

The City of Charleston Fire Department consists over 300 full-time firefighters. These firefighters operate out of 21 companies located throughout the city: 16 engine companies, two tower companies, two ladder companies, a heavy rescue company, a HAZ-MAT unit and several special units. Training, Fire Marshall, Operations, and Administration are the divisions of the department. The department operates on a 24/48 schedule and is a Class 1 ISO rating. Russell (Rusty) Thomas served as Fire Chief until June 2008, and was succeeded by Chief Thomas Carr in November 2008. The department is presently led by Chief Daniel Curia.

Police department
The City of Charleston Police Department, with a total of 458 sworn officers, 117 civilians, and 27 reserve police officers, is South Carolina's largest police department. Luther Reynolds serves as the current Chief of Police. He follows Greg Mullen and Reuben Greenberg. Chief Reynolds is credited with continuing successful community outreach programs such as The Illumination Project and fostering a culture of mutual respect. Under Chief Reynolds, the agency has successfully withstood challenges such as the Coronavirus and downtown disturbances. Additionally, the agency continues to recruit police candidates in a competitive market.

EMS and medical centers
Emergency medical services (EMS) for the city are provided by Charleston County Emergency Medical Services (CCEMS) & Berkeley County Emergency Medical Services (BCEMS). The city is served by the EMS and 911 services of both Charleston and Berkeley counties since the city is part of both counties.

Charleston is the primary medical center for the eastern portion of the state. The city has several major hospitals located in the downtown area: Medical University of South Carolina Medical Center (MUSC), Ralph H. Johnson VA Medical Center, and Roper Hospital. MUSC is the state's first school of medicine, the largest medical university in the state, and the sixth-oldest continually operating school of medicine in the United States. The downtown medical district is experiencing rapid growth of biotechnology and medical research industries coupled with substantial expansions of all the major hospitals. Additionally, more expansions are planned or underway at another major hospital located in the West Ashley portion of the city: Bon Secours-St Francis Xavier Hospital. The Trident Regional Medical Center located in the City of North Charleston and East Cooper Regional Medical Center located in Mount Pleasant also serve the needs of residents of the city of Charleston.

Coast Guard Station Charleston
Coast Guard Station Charleston responds to search and rescue emergencies, conducts maritime law enforcement activities, and Ports, Waterways, and Coastal Security (PWCS) missions. Personnel from Station Charleston are highly trained professionals, composed of federal law enforcement officers, boat crewmen, and coxswains who are capable of completing a wide range of missions. In 2020, the Coast Guard announced plans to construct a  "superbase" on the former Charleston Naval Shipyard complex to consolidate all its Charleston-area facilities and become the homeport for five Security cutters and additional offshore cutters.

Coast Guard Sector Charleston (District 7)
Coast Guard Station Charleston
Coast Guard Helicopter Air Facility, Johns Island, Charleston
Coast Guard Reserves, Charleston
USCGC Yellowfin, Marine Protector-class coastal patrol boat, Charleston
USCGC Anvil, 75-foot inland construction tender, Charleston
USCGC Willow, (WLB-202), Charleston

Military
Army Corps of Engineers, Charleston District Headquarters
U.S. Coast Guard
Joint Base Charleston (Navy & Air Force)

Crime

The following table shows Charleston's crime rate for six crimes that Morgan Quitno uses to calculate the ranking of "America's most dangerous cities", in comparison to the national average. The statistics shown are for the number of crimes committed per 100,000 people. Since 1999, the overall crime rate of Charleston has declined markedly. The total crime index rate for Charleston in 1999 was 597.1 crimes committed per 100,000 people, while in 2011, the total crime index rate was 236.4 per 100,000.

Transportation

Airport and rail
The City of Charleston is served by the Charleston International Airport. It is the busiest passenger airport in South Carolina . The airport shares runways with the adjacent Charleston Air Force Base. Charleston Executive Airport is a smaller airport located in the John's Island section of the city of Charleston and is used by noncommercial aircraft. Both airports are owned and operated by the Charleston County Aviation Authority. As of April 2019, British Airways does seasonal non-stop flights from Charleston to London-Heathrow.

Charleston is served by two daily Amtrak trains: The Palmetto and Silver Meteor at the Amtrak station located at 4565 Gaynor Avenue in the City of North Charleston located around 7.5 miles from downtown Charleston.

Interstates and highways

Interstate 26 (I-26) begins in downtown Charleston, with exits to the Septima Clark Expressway, the Arthur Ravenel Jr. Bridge and Meeting Street. Heading northwest, it connects the city to North Charleston, the Charleston International Airport, I-95, and Columbia. The Arthur Ravenel Jr. Bridge and Septima Clark Expressway are part of U.S. Route 17 (US 17), which travels east–west through the cities of Charleston and Mount Pleasant. The Mark Clark Expressway, or I-526, is the bypass around the city and begins and ends at US 17. US 52 is Meeting Street and its spur is East Bay Street, which becomes Morrison Drive after leaving the east side. This highway merges with King Street in the city's Neck area (industrial district). US 78 is King Street in the downtown area, eventually merging with Meeting Street.

Major highways
Interstate 26 (eastern terminus is in Charleston)
Interstate 526
U.S. Route 17
U.S. Route 52 (eastern terminus is in Charleston)
U.S. Route 78 (eastern terminus is in Charleston)
State Highway 7 (Sam Rittenberg Boulevard)
State Highway 30 (James Island Expressway)
State Highway 61 (St. Andrews Boulevard/Ashley River Road)
State Highway 171 (Old Towne Road/Folly Road)
State Highway 461 (Paul Cantrell Boulevard/Glenn McConnell Parkway)
South Carolina Highway 700 (Maybank Highway)

Arthur Ravenel Jr. Bridge
The Arthur Ravenel Jr. Bridge across the Cooper River opened on July 16, 2005, and was the longest cable-stayed bridge in the Americas at the time of its construction. The bridge links downtown Charleston with Mount Pleasant, and has eight lanes plus a 12-foot lane shared by pedestrians and bicycles. The height of the bridge varies, but it is estimated that it has a height of 573 feet. It replaced the Grace Memorial Bridge (built in 1929) and the Silas N. Pearman Bridge (built in 1966). They were considered two of the more dangerous bridges in America and were demolished after the Ravenel Bridge opened.

City bus service
The city is also served by a bus system, operated by the Charleston Area Regional Transportation Authority (CARTA). Most of the urban area is served by regional fixed route buses, which are equipped with bike racks as part of the system's Rack and Ride program. CARTA offers connectivity to historic downtown attractions and accommodations with the Downtown Area Shuttle trolley buses, and it offers curbside pickup for disabled passengers with its Tel-A-Ride buses. A bus rapid transit system is in development, called Lowcountry Rapid Transit that will connect Charleston to Summerville through North Charleston.

Rural parts of the city and metropolitan area are served by a different bus system, operated by Berkeley-Charleston-Dorchester Rural Transportation Management Association. The system is also commonly called the TriCounty Link.

Port

The Port of Charleston, owned and operated by the South Carolina Ports Authority, is one of the largest ports in the United States, ranked seventh in the top 25 by containerized cargo volume in 2018. It consists of six terminals, with the sixth having opened in April 2021. Port activity at the two terminals located in the city of Charleston is one of the city's leading sources of revenue, behind tourism.

Today, the Port of Charleston boasts the deepest water in the southeast region and regularly handles ships too big to transit through the Panama Canal. A harbor-deepening project is currently underway to take the Port of Charleston's entrance channel to 54 feet and harbor channel to 52 feet at mean low tide. With an average high tide of 6 feet, the depth clearances will become 60 feet and 58 feet, respectively.

Part of Union Pier Treminal, in the city of Charleston, is a cruise ship passenger terminal which hosted numerous cruise departures annually through 2019. Beginning in May 2019, until cruise operations were interrupted in April 2020, the Carnival Sunshine was permanently stationed in Charleston, offering 4, 5, and 7-day cruises to the Caribbean.

With the closure of the Naval Base and the Charleston Naval Shipyard in 1996, Detyens, Inc. signed a long-term lease. With three dry docks, one floating dock, and six piers, Detyens Shipyard, Inc. is one of the largest commercial marine repair facilities on the East Coast. Projects include military, commercial, and cruise ships.

Schools, colleges, and universities

Because most of the city of Charleston is located in Charleston County, it is served by the Charleston County School District. Part of the city, however, is served by the Berkeley County School District in northern portions of the city, such as the Cainhoy Industrial District, Cainhoy Historical District and Daniel Island.

Charleston is also served by a large number of independent schools, including Porter-Gaud School (K-12), Charleston Collegiate School (K-12), Ashley Hall (Pre K-12), Charleston Day School (K-8), First Baptist Church School (K-12), Palmetto Christian Academy (K-12), Coastal Christian Preparatory School (K-12), Mason Preparatory School (K-8), and Addlestone Hebrew Academy (K-8).

The Roman Catholic Diocese of Charleston Office of Education also operates out of the city and oversees several K-8 parochial schools, such as Blessed Sacrament School, Christ Our King School, Charleston Catholic School, Nativity School, and Divine Redeemer School, all of which are "feeder" schools into Bishop England High School, a diocesan high school within the city. Bishop England, Porter-Gaud School, and Ashley Hall are the city's oldest and most prominent private schools, and are a significant part of Charleston history, dating back some 150 years.

Public institutions of higher education in Charleston include the College of Charleston, The Citadel, The Military College of South Carolina, and the Medical University of South Carolina. The city is also home to private schools including the Charleston Southern University and Charleston School of Law. Charleston is also home to the Roper Hospital School of Practical Nursing, and the city has a downtown satellite campus for the region's technical school, Trident Technical College. Charleston has the only college in the country that offers bachelor's degrees in the building arts, The American College of the Building Arts.

Media

Broadcast television
Charleston is the nation's 89th-largest Designated market area (DMA), with 332,770 households and 0.27% of the U.S. TV population. These stations are licensed in Charleston and have significant operations or viewers in the city:
WCBD-TV (2, NBC) and (14, CW)
WGWG (4, Heroes & Icons)
WCSC-TV (5, CBS, Bounce TV, Grit)
WITV (7, PBS)
WLCN-CD (18, CTN)
WTAT-TV (24, Fox)
WAZS-CD (29, Azteca America Independent)
WJNI-CD (31, America One Independent)
WCIV (36, MyNetworkTV, ABC, MeTV)

Notable people

As a population and wealth center with colleges and cultural outlets, Charleston has produced many notable people in all fields. Among the most notable historical and contemporary figures are:

 Jarrell Brantley (born 1996), basketball player
 Madelyn Cline, Actress in Outer Banks
 Stephen Colbert, comedian and host of The Late Show
 Wesley Donehue, political strategist, Internet consultant, CEO
 Ann Drayton, 18th-century landowner
 Shepard Fairey, graffiti artist
 Robert F. Furchgott, recipient of Nobel Prize in Physiology or Medicine (1998)
 Thomas Gibson, actor and star of Criminal Minds
 Fritz Hollings, former US Senator and Governor of South Carolina
 Lauren Hutton, model and actress, starring in American Gigolo and The Gambler (1974)
 Robert Jordan (James Oliver Rigney Jr.), fantasy author, notable for Wheel of Time series
 John Laurens, American revolutionary lieutenant colonel in the continental army
 Peter Manigault, wealthiest person in British North America in 1770
 Khris Middleton, NBA basketball player, gold medal Olympian
 Darius Rucker, country music artist, former member of Hootie & The Blowfish
 Robert Smalls, African American civil war hero, businessman, politician, and civil rights activist
 Denmark Vesey, revolutionary
 Joseph Wragg, a pioneer of the large-scale slave trade

Sister cities
Charleston's sister cities are:
Doha, Qatar
Freetown, Sierra Leone
Panama City, Panama
Speightstown, Barbados
Spoleto, Italy

The relationship with Spoleto began when Pulitzer Prize-winning Italian composer Gian Carlo Menotti selected Charleston as the city to host the American version of Spoleto's annual Festival of Two Worlds. "Looking for a city that would provide the charm of Spoleto, as well as its wealth of theaters, churches, and other performance spaces, they selected Charleston, South Carolina, as the ideal location. The historic city provided a perfect fit: intimate enough that the Festival would captivate the entire city, yet cosmopolitan enough to provide an enthusiastic audience and robust infrastructure."

Sister city relation with Panama City was described as follows:

Charleston is also twinned with Speightstown. The first colonists to settle in the region designed the original parts of Charlestown based on the plans of Barbados's capital city, Bridgetown. Many indigo, tobacco, and cotton planters relocated their slaves and plantation operations from Speightstown to Charleston after the sugarcane industry came to dominate agricultural production in Barbados.

See also

 List of municipalities in South Carolina
 USS Charleston, 6 ships

Notes

References

Works cited

.

Further reading

General
Borick, Carl P. A Gallant Defense: The Siege of Charleston, 1780. U. of South Carolina Press, 2003. 332 pp.
Bull, Kinloch Jr. The Oligarchs in Colonial and Revolutionary Charleston: Lieutenant Governor William Bull II and His Family. U. of South Carolina Press, 1991. 415 pp.
Clarke, Peter. A Free Church in a Free Society. The Ecclesiology of John England, Bishop of Charleston, 1820–1842, a Nineteenth Century Missionary Bishop in the Southern United States. Charleston, South Carolina: Bagpipe, 1982. 561 pp.
Coker, P. C., III. Charleston's Maritime Heritage, 1670–1865: An Illustrated History. Charleston, South Carolina: Coker-Craft, 1987. 314 pp.
Doyle, Don H. New Men, New Cities, New South: Atlanta, Nashville, Charleston, Mobile, 1860–1910. U. of North Carolina Press, 1990. 369 pp.
Fraser, Walter J. Jr. Charleston! Charleston! The History of a Southern City. U. of South Carolina, 1990. 542 pp. the standard scholarly history
Gillespie, Joanna Bowen. The Life and Times of Martha Laurens Ramsay, 1759–1811. U. of South Carolina Press, 2001.
Goloboy, Jennifer L. Charleston and the Emergence of Middle-Class Culture in the Revolutionary Era. Athens, GA; University of Georgia Press, 2016.
Hagy, James William. This Happy Land: The Jews of Colonial and Antebellum Charleston. U. of Alabama Press, 1993.
Hart, Emma. Building Charleston: Town and Society in the Eighteenth Century British Atlantic World (University of Virginia Press, 2010, University of South Carolina Press 2015)
Jaher, Frederic Cople. The Urban Establishment: Upper Strata in Boston, New York, Charleston, Chicago, and Los Angeles. U. of Illinois Press, 1982. 777 pp.
Pease, William H. and Pease, Jane H. The Web of Progress: Private Values and Public Styles in Boston and Charleston, 1828–1843.  Oxford U. Press, 1985. 352 pp.
Pease, Jane H. and Pease, William H. A Family of Women: The Carolina Petigrus in Peace and War. U. of North Carolina Press, 1999. 328 pp.
Pease, Jane H. and Pease, William H. Ladies, Women, and Wenches: Choice and Constraint in Antebellum Charleston and Boston. U. of North Carolina Press, 1990. 218 pp.
Phelps, W. Chris. The Bombardment of Charleston, 1863–1865. Gretna, La.: Pelican, 2002. 175 pp.
Rosen, Robert N. Confederate Charleston: An Illustrated History of the City and the People during the Civil War. U. of South Carolina Press, 1994. 181 pp.
Rosen, Robert. A Short History of Charleston. University of South Carolina Press, (1997). , scholarly survey
Spence, E. Lee. Spence's Guide to South Carolina: diving, 639 shipwrecks (1520–1813), saltwater sport fishing, recreational shrimping, crabbing, oystering, clamming, saltwater aquarium, 136 campgrounds, 281 boat landings (Nelson Southern Printing, Sullivan's Island, South Carolina: Spence, ©1976) OCLC: 2846435
Spence, E. Lee. Treasures of the Confederate Coast: the "real Rhett Butler" & Other Revelations (Narwhal Press, Charleston/Miami, ©1995)  ,

Art, architecture, city planning, literature, science

Cothran, James R. Gardens of Historic Charleston. U. of South Carolina Press, 1995. 177 pp.

Greene, Harlan. Mr. Skylark: John Bennett and the Charleston Renaissance. U. of Georgia Press, 2001. 372 pp.

Hutchisson, James M. and Greene, Harlan, ed. Renaissance in Charleston: Art and Life in the Carolina Low Country, 1900–1940. U. of Georgia Press, 2003. 259 pp.
Hutchisson, James M. DuBose Heyward: A Charleston Gentleman and the World of Porgy and Bess. U. Press of Mississippi, 2000. 225 pp.
 .

McNeil, Jim. Charleston's Navy Yard: A Picture History. Charleston, South Carolina: Coker Craft, 1985. 217 pp.

O'Brien, Michael and Moltke-Hansen, David, ed. Intellectual Life in Antebellum Charleston.  U. of Tennessee Press, 1986. 468 pp.
Poston, Jonathan H. The Buildings of Charleston: A Guide to the City's Architecture. U. of South Carolina Press, 1997. 717 pp.
 

Stephens, Lester D. Science, Race, and Religion in the American South: John Bachman and the Charleston Circle of Naturalists, 1815–1895. U. of North Carolina Press, 2000. 338 pp.

 
 .
Yuhl, Stephanie E. A Golden Haze of Memory: The Making of Historic Charleston. U. of North Carolina Press, 2005. 285 pp.
Zola, Gary Phillip. Isaac Harby of Charleston, 1788–1828: Jewish Reformer and Intellectual. U. of Alabama Press, 1994. 284 pp.
Susan Harbage Page and Juan Logan. "Prop Master at Charleston's Gibbes Museum of Art", Southern Spaces, September 21, 2009.
Nelson, Emily The Locket, 2010, 207 pp. The Angel Oak tree at Johns Island near Charleston is featured prominently in the book, The Locket by Emily Nelson.
Wilson, Thomas D. The Ashley Cooper Plan: The Founding of Carolina and the Origins of Southern Political Culture. Chapel Hill, N.C.: University of North Carolina Press, 2016.

Race
Bellows, Barbara L. Benevolence among Slaveholders: Assisting the Poor in Charleston, 1670–1860. Baton Rouge, LA: Louisiana State U. Press, 1993.
Drago, Edmund L. Initiative, Paternalism, and Race Relations: Charleston's Avery Normal Institute. Athens, GA: University of Georgia Press, 1990.
Egerton, Douglas R. He Shall Go Out Free: The Lives of Denmark Vesey. Madison House, 1999.
Greene, Harlan; Hutchins, Harry S. Jr.; and Hutchins, Brian E. Slave Badges and the Slave-Hire System in Charleston, South Carolina, 1783–1865. McFarland, 2004. 194 pp.
Jenkins, Wilbert L. Seizing the New Day: African Americans in Post-Civil War Charleston. Bloomington, IN: Indiana University Press, 1998. 256 pp.
Johnson, Michael P. and Roark, James L. No Chariot Let Down: Charleston's Free People of Color on the Eve of the Civil War.  Chapel Hill, NC: University of North Carolina Press, 1984.
Kennedy, Cynthia M. Braided Relations, Entwined Lives: The Women of Charleston's Urban Slave Society. Bloomington, IN: Indiana University Press, 2005. 
Powers, Bernard E. Jr. Black Charlestonians: A Social History, 1822–1885. U. of Arkansas Press, 1994.
Strickland, Jeff. Unequal Freedoms: Ethnicity, Race, and White Supremacy in Civil War-Era Charleston. Gainesville, FL: University Press of Florida, 2015.
Wilson, Thomas D. The Ashley Cooper Plan: The Founding of Carolina and the Origins of Southern Political Culture. Chapel Hill, NC: University of North Carolina Press, 2016.

External links

 
 Charleston Tourism Guide
 

 
Charleston–North Charleston–Summerville metropolitan area
Cities in Berkeley County, South Carolina
Cities in Charleston County, South Carolina
Cities in South Carolina
County seats in South Carolina
Former colonial and territorial capitals in the United States
South Carolina
Populated coastal places in South Carolina
Populated places established in 1670
Port cities and towns of the United States Atlantic coast
Regions of South Carolina